I Know You Want Me may refer to:

 "I Know You Want Me" (Young Buck song), 2006
 "I Know You Want Me" (Nastyboy Klick song), 1998
 "I Know You Want Me (Calle Ocho)", a 2009 song by Pitbull